Tashchishma (Taşşişmä) is a rural locality (a village) in Bishkurayevsky Selsoviet, Ilishevsky District, Bashkortostan, Russia. The population was 9 as of 2010. There is 1 street.

Geography 
Tashchishma is located 36 km southeast of Verkhneyarkeyevo (the district's administrative centre) by road. Lena is the nearest rural locality.

References 

Rural localities in Ilishevsky District